Rozalia Şooş, also known as Rozalia Șoș (born February 1, 1947 in Târgu Mureş, Romania) is a former Romanian handball player who competed in the 1976 Summer Olympics.

She was part of the Romanian handball team, which finished fourth in the Olympic tournament. She played four matches and scored nine goals.

References

1947 births
Living people
Romanian female handball players 
Olympic handball players of Romania
Handball players at the 1976 Summer Olympics
Romanian sportspeople of Hungarian descent